Sherpi Kangri is a mountain peak in the Karakoram Range. It lies six km south of Ghent Kangri (7,380 m) and ten km northwest of Saltoro Kangri (7,742 m).

Sherpi Kangri I is the higher, western summit at 7380 m.  Sherpi Kangri II at approximately 7100 m is further east.

See also
 List of mountains in Pakistan
 Gilgit–Baltistan
 List of mountains in India
 Ladakh

Notes

External links
 Northern Pakistan detailed placemarks in Google Earth

Mountains of Ladakh
Seven-thousanders of the Karakoram